M1915 may refer to:
 305 mm howitzer M1915, Russian artillery piece
 37 mm trench gun M1915, Russian artillery piece
 Standschütze Hellriegel M1915, Austro-Hungarian submachine gun
 Ruby M1915, a self-loading pistol used as a French World War I sidearm
 Beretta Model 1915, an Italian semi-automatic pistol in World War I

See also
 M1916 (disambiguation)